Tvärsnitt (Swedish: Cross Section) was a Swedish language popular science magazine published in Stockholm, Sweden, in the period 1979–2011.

History and profile
Tvärsnitt was started in Stockholm in 1979. The magazine featured popular articles on humanities and social sciences. Until 2000 the magazine was published by the Humanities and Social Sciences Research Council. Then it was published by the Swedish Research Council until 2011 when it ceased publication.

Editors
The editors of Tvärsnitt included:
1979–1985: Tore Frängsmyr
1986–1991: Sverker Sörlin
1992–1996: Kjell Jonsson
1996–2002: Martin Kylhammar
2002–2004: Johan Lundberg
2004–2006: Liselotte Englund
2006-2010 Helena Bornholm
–2011: Ragnhild Romanus

References

1979 establishments in Sweden
2011 disestablishments in Sweden
Defunct magazines published in Sweden
Magazines established in 1979
Magazines disestablished in 2011
Magazines published in Stockholm
Popular science magazines
Swedish-language magazines